Crossoloricaria bahuaja is a species of armored catfish. It is found in Peru where it is found in the Madre de Dios River basin and Bolivia where it is found in the Rio Grande and the Rio Manuripe.  This species grows to a length of  SL.

Ecology
Stomach contents of C. bahuaja include larvae of aquatic insects, small seeds and debris. C. bahuaja males have been found carrying eggs on their lips.

References 
 

Loricariini
Fish of South America
Freshwater fish of Peru
Fish of Bolivia
Fish described in 1999